Quickly is one of the largest tapioca milk tea franchises in the world.

Quickly may also refer to:

 Mistress Quickly, two characters in plays by William Shakespeare
 Tommy Quickly (born 1943), Liverpool rock and roll singer
 Quickly (software), a developed by Canonical to make building of new apps easier
 NSU Quickly, a moped manufactured by NSU Motorenwerke AG of Germany from 1953 to 1963.

See also

 Quick (disambiguation)
 Quicken
 Quickening (disambiguation)
 Quickie (disambiguation)